Atlegach (Atlığas) is a rural locality (a selo) in Izhboldinsky Selsoviet, Yanaulsky District, Bashkortostan, Russia. The population was 398 as of 2010. There are 9 streets.

Geography 
Atlegach is located 27 km south of Yanaul (the district's administrative centre) by road. Novotroitsk is the nearest rural locality.

References 

Rural localities in Yanaulsky District